Pennsylvania's state elections were held November 6, 2001. Necessary primary elections were held on May 15, 2001.

Justice of the Supreme Court

Judge of the Superior Court

Judge of the Commonwealth Court

Judicial retention

Supreme Court

Superior Court

Commonwealth Court

References

 
Elections
Pennsylvania